Mick, Mike or Michael Reynolds may refer to:

Actors
Mike Reynolds (actor) (1929–2022), American voice actor and writer
Michael Reynolds, British actor in one episode of BBC's David Copperfield (1966) and The First Churchills#Cast (1969)
Michael J. Reynolds (1939–2018), Canadian actor

Footballers
Mick Reynolds (born 1935), Irish footballer, Gaelic midfielder on List of Featherstone Rovers players
Michael Reynolds (footballer) (born 1963), Australian rules forward

Politicians
Mike Reynolds (politician) (born 1946), Australian Labor Member of Parliament, Queensland Legislative Assembly Speaker
Michael Reynolds, American Right to Life candidate in 1998 New York gubernatorial election#Results
Mike Reynolds, American Republican Member of 2003–05 49th Oklahoma Legislature#Members District 91

Writers
Michael S. Reynolds (1937–2000), American biographer of Ernest Hemingway#References cited
Michael E. Reynolds (born 1945), American architect, founder of Earthship Biotecture a/k/a Mike Reynolds
Michael D. Reynolds (1954–2019), American astronomer and academic a/k/a Mike D. Reynolds

Others
Michael Reynolds (United Irishmen) (c.1771–1798), United Irish Kildare rebel leader
Mike Reynolds (conservationist) (1931–2007), British ad man who started World Parrot Trust
Michael Joseph Reynolds (1945–1975), Irish police officer murdered by IRA member
Michael Curtis Reynolds (born 1958), American convicted of plotting domestic terrorism
Mike Reynolds, New Zealand business executive, 2009 CEO of telecommunications provider 2degrees#History
Michael T. Reynolds, American acting director of National Park Service in 2017–18
Michael Reynolds, lead singer of 2002–06 American country music group Pinmonkey

Characters
Michael Reynolds, businessman in 2001 Japanese videogame Illbleed